The 1892 Amateur Hockey Association of Canada season lasted until March 7. The championship changed hands twice during the season. Ottawa defeated the Montreal Hockey Club in January and held the championship until March, defending it six times before Montreal won it in the final challenge of the season, defeating Ottawa 1–0.

Season 

The Britannia Hockey Club of Montreal mounted their first challenge. Ontario champion Ottawa Hockey Club took over the championship by defeating the Montreal Hockey Club, and held it until the final game of the season, when the Montreal HC defeated them at their home Rideau Rink. It was the Montreal HC's only win of the season. The result is said to have displeased Governor-General Stanley, and after the season, he announced his donation of the Stanley Cup at the Ottawa HC end-of-season banquet, and asked for changes in the determination of the championship.

Overall record 

† League Champion by winning final challenge

Schedule and results 

Games consisted of a mixture of Challenge games and Exhibition (friendlies)

Player statistics

Goaltending averages 
Note: GP = Games played, GA = Goals against, SO = Shutouts, GAA = Goals against average

Source: Ultimate Hockey

Scoring leaders 

Source: Ultimate Hockey

References 
 
 

Amateur Hockey Association of Canada seasons
AHAC